Theatrum Orbis Terrarum ("Theatre of the Orb of the World") is considered to be the first true modern atlas. Written by Abraham Ortelius, strongly encouraged by Gillis Hooftman and originally printed on 20 May 1570 in Antwerp,  it consisted of a collection of uniform map sheets and supporting text bound to form a book for which copper printing plates were specifically engraved. The Ortelius atlas is sometimes referred to as the summary of sixteenth-century cartography. The publication of the Theatrum Orbis Terrarum (1570) is often considered as the official beginning of the Golden Age of Netherlandish cartography (approximately 1570s–1670s).

Content
The atlas contained virtually no maps from the hand of Ortelius, but 53 bundled maps of other masters, with the source as indicated. Previously, groupings of disparate maps were only released as custom lots, to individual order. In the Ortelius atlas, however, the maps were all in the same style and of the same size, printed from copper plates, logically arranged by continent, region and state. In addition to the maps he provided a descriptive comment and referrals on the reverse. This was the first time that the entirety of Western European knowledge of the world was brought together in one book.

In the bibliography, in the section 'Catalogus Auctorum', not only were the 33 cartographers mentioned whose work was recorded in the Theatrum (which at the time was not yet customary), but also the total of 87 cartographers of the 16th century that Ortelius knew. This list grew in every Latin Edition, and included no less than 183 names in 1601. Among the sources the following are mentioned: for the world map, the World Map (1561) by Giacomo Gastaldi; the porto Avenue of the Atlantic coast (1562) by Diego Gutierrez, the world map (1569) of Gerardus Mercator, which have eight maps derived from the Theatrum.

For the map of Europe, wall map (1554). of the Mercator map of Scandinavia (1539) by Olaus Magnus, map of Asia was derived from his own Asia-map from 1567, which in turn was inspired by that of Gastaldi (1559). Also for the Africa map he referred to Gastaldi.

This work by Ortelius, consisted of a collection of the best maps, refined by himself, combined into one map or split across multiple, and on the same size (folios of approximately 35 x 50 cm). The naming and location coordinates were not normalized.

Editions
After the initial publication of Theatrum Orbis Terrarum, Ortelius regularly revised and expanded the atlas, reissuing it in various formats until his death in 1598. From its original seventy maps and eighty-seven bibliographic references in the first edition (1570), the atlas grew through its thirty-one editions to encompass 183 references and 167 maps in 1612.

The online copy of the 1573 volume held by the State Library of New South Wales contains 70 numbered double-page sheets, tipped onto stubs at the centerfold, with six maps combined with descriptive letterpress on the recto of each first leaf. The legends of most maps name the author whose map Ortelius adapted. In the preface Ortelius credits Franciscus Hogenberg with engraving nearly all the maps.

The 1573 Additamentum to the atlas is notable for containing Humphrey Llwyd's Cambriae Typus, the first map to show Wales on its own.

From the 1630s, the Blaeu family issued their work under a similar title, Theatrum orbis terrarum, sive, Atlas Novus.

Structure 

All the editions had the same structure. They started with an allegorical title page, on which the five known continents were presented by allegorical women, with Europe as the Queen. Then a reference to Philip II, King of Spain and the Low Countries, and a poem by Adolphus Mekerchus (Adolf of Meetkercke). From 1579, the editions contain a portrait of Ortelius by Philip Galle, an introduction by Ortelius, in the Latin editions followed by a recommendation by Mercator. This is followed by the bibliography (Catalogus Auctorum), an index (Index Tabularum), the maps with text on the back, followed (starting from 1579 in the Latin editions) by a register of place names in ancient times (Nomenclator), the treatise, the Mona Druidum insula of the Welsh scientist Humphrey Lhuyd (Humphrey Llwyd) over the Anglesey coat of arms, and finally the 'privilege' and a colophon.

Cost 
The moneyed middle class, which had much interest in knowledge and science, turned out to be very much interested in the convenient size and the pooling of knowledge. For buyers who were not strong in Latin, from the end of 1572, in addition to the Latin version, Dutch, German and French editions were published. 
This rapid success prompted the Ortelius Theatrum to constantly expand and improve. In 1573, he released 17 more additional maps under the title Additamentum Theatri Orbis Terrarum, bringing the total at 70 maps. By Ortelius' death in 1598, there were twenty-five editions that had appeared in seven different languages.

Image gallery

See also

Maris Pacifici
Ancient world maps
History of cartography
List of geographers
Mappa Mundi
Here be dragons
Terra incognita
Golden Age of Netherlandish cartography (also known as the Golden Age of Dutch and Flemish cartography)

Notes

References

External links
 High-resolution zoomable images from the 1570A edition - from RareMaps.com
High resolution zoomable images from the 1574 edition - collection item from the State Library of Victoria
 High-resolution scan of French edition (1587) of the Theatrum Orbis Terrarum from the World Digital Library
High resolution zoomable images from the 1573 edition - collection item from the State Library of New South Wales

1570 books
Atlases
1570 in the Habsburg Netherlands
16th-century Latin books
Historic maps of the world
Early modern Netherlandish cartography